Pioneer Montessori Inter College is an educational institution in Uttar Pradesh and is spread in Lucknow and Barabanki, Uttar Pradesh, India.

The institute is headquartered in Rajendra Nagar, Lucknow. It was founded in 1963 in Lucknow. Subsequently, several branches were opened in Lucknow and Barabanki. Degree section was started in 2003 at Lakhpera Bagh, Barabanki. As of 2013, the group operates 20 branches including 3 degree colleges. The institution has completed its 55 years in 2013.

Classes from nursery to intermediate are conducted under the 10+2 pattern of education. The school has 30,000 students.

The school is affiliated to the UP Board, CBSE, ICSE, and imparts education in Hindi and English medium.

References

Best Scholarships for Pioneer Montessori College Students==External links==
 

Primary schools in Uttar Pradesh
High schools and secondary schools in Uttar Pradesh
Private schools in Lucknow
Schools in Barabanki, Uttar Pradesh
Educational institutions established in 1964
1964 establishments in Uttar Pradesh
Intermediate colleges in Uttar Pradesh